A by-election was held for the New South Wales Legislative Assembly electorate of West Sydney on 18 February 1865 because John Darvall had been appointed Attorney General, and John Robertson had been appointed Secretary for Lands in the fourth Cowper ministry. Such ministerial by-elections were usually uncontested however on this occasion a poll was required in East Sydney (Charles Cowper), The Glebe (Thomas Smart) and West Sydney. Each minister was comfortably re-elected. Only The Paterson (William Arnold) was uncontested.

Daniel Dalgleish was a former member for West Sydney who was defeated at the election on 24 November 1864. He was then an unsuccessful candidate at the elections for The Glebe (29 November 1864), Goldfields South (10 January 1865), and The Glebe (17 February 1865). This was the final occasion on which he stood for parliament.

Dates

Result

John Darvall was appointed Attorney General, and John Robertson was appointed Secretary for Lands in the fourth Cowper ministry.

See also
 Electoral results for the district of West Sydney
List of New South Wales state by-elections

Notes

References

1865 elections in Australia
New South Wales state by-elections
1860s in New South Wales